Elachista neapolisella is a moth of the family Elachistidae. It is found on Crete.

References

neapolisella
Moths described in 1985
Moths of Europe